Ada Dondini (18 March 1883 – 3 January 1958) was an Italian film actress. She appeared in 48 films between 1916 and 1954. She was born in Cosenza, Italy and died in Chieti, Italy.

Selected filmography

 The Charmer (1931)
 Just Married (1934)
 Mr. Desire (1934)
 I Love You Only (1935)
 Joe the Red (1936)
 Piccolo mondo antico (1941)
 Schoolgirl Diary (1941)
 The Secret Lover (1941)
 Invisible Chains (1942)
 Malombra (1942)
 Luisa Sanfelice (1942)
 La valle del diavolo (1943)
 The Za-Bum Circus (1944)
 The Innocent Casimiro (1945)
 The Ten Commandments (1945)
 The Ways of Sin (1946)
 Un giorno nella vita (1946)
 The Two Orphans (1947)
 Fear and Sand (1948)
 Little Lady (1949)
 The Cadets of Gascony (1950)
 Women and Brigands (1950)
 Toto the Sheik (1950)
 Honeymoon Deferred (1951)
 Toto the Third Man (1951)
 Tragic Spell (1951)
 Sunday Heroes (1952)
 The Enemy (1952)
 Via Padova 46 (1953)

References

External links

1883 births
1958 deaths
Italian film actresses
Italian silent film actresses
People from Cosenza
People of Calabrian descent
20th-century Italian actresses